The 2014 Monster Energy FIM Speedway World Cup Final was the last and final race of the 2014 edition of the Speedway World Cup. It was staged on August 2 at the Polonia Stadium in Bydgoszcz, Poland,. It was won by Denmark. They beat hosts and defending champions Poland by a single point, with Australia a further point back in third.

Denmark were led to success by a stunning performance from three-time world champion Nicki Pedersen, who scored 17 of his country's 38 points. Niels-Kristian Iversen, Peter Kildemand and Mads Korneliussen completed the successful line-up. Poland and Denmark were level on 35 points apiece heading into the final heat 20 and initially Janusz Kołodziej held the advantage for the hosts, however Iversen passed him on the last corner of the last lap to steal the title for Denmark.

Results

Scores

References

See also 
 2014 Speedway Grand Prix

2014 Speedway World Cup